Qomsheh-ye Seyyed Yaqub (also Romanized as Qomsheh-ye Seyyed Ya‘qūb) is a village in Mahidasht Rural District, Mahidasht District, Kermanshah County, Kermanshah Province, Iran. At the 2006 census, its population was 492, in 119 families.

References 

Populated places in Kermanshah County